D'Arros Island Airport  is an airstrip serving D'Arros Island in the Seychelles.

The Darros non-directional beacon (Ident: DAR) is located on the field.

After its purchase in 2012, the island and the neighboring atoll were designated a nature reserve in 2014.

Airlines and Destinations

See also

Transport in Seychelles
List of airports in Seychelles

References

External links
OpenStreetMap - D'Arros Island
OurAirports - D'Arros Island
FallingRain - D'Arros Island Airport

Airports in Seychelles